The Kalamazoo Department of Public Safety is the department charged with police, fire and rescue operations in Kalamazoo, Michigan. It is one of the largest public safety departments in the nation, with over 250 sworn officers. Each officer serves as a Police Officer, Firefighter, and Medical First Responder.

Public safety model
The Kalamazoo Police Department and Kalamazoo Fire Department were merged in the 1980s with the goal of saving significant tax payer money while increasing the amount of police and fire protection for its citizens.  The merger of the departments was a difficult process on reaching agreement with unions covering the fire department and police department.  The difficult effort of the merger of the departments along with the successes was even noted by the United States House of Representatives in the Congressional Record.

As the largest public safety department in the nation, Kalamazoo Public Safety is now considered a model public safety department and often consults and trains other cities throughout the world on the public safety model.

Controversies
In 1995 a grand jury was convened to investigate missing cash and contraband from Kalamazoo Public Safety's evidence room. Although much of the evidence and investigation remains secret and the US Attorney declined to prosecute, the city attorney at the time has publicly acknowledged that the incident happened

In 2013, the department received the results of a year-long, independent study it commissioned on racial targeting. The study showed that police in Kalamazoo were more than twice as likely to pull over black drivers than white drivers. Since this time the department has been working hard to confront the racial bias in its department and has received international news coverage for attempting to address the racial issues the department acknowledges it has.

Casualties
On April 18, 2011, while responding to a shots fired call in Kalamazoo's Edison neighborhood, PSO Eric Zapata was fatally shot. Officer Zapata was the first officer in Kalamazoo to be killed in the line of duty.

References

External links
 Kalamazoo Public Safety Promotional Video

Municipal police departments of Michigan
Fire departments in Michigan
Kalamazoo, Michigan
1983 establishments in Michigan